Remote Radar Head Buchan or RRH Buchan is an air defence radar station operated by the Royal Air Force.

The unit is based at the operations site of the former RAF Buchan which downgraded from an RAF station to a remote radar head (RRH) in September 2004.

History

RAF Buchan 

RAF Buchan opened in 1952 as an Air Defence Radar Unit. As part of the UK Air Surveillance and Control System, the station was one of two Control and Reporting Centres (CRC) which monitored air traffic in and around UK airspace. RAF Buchan was parent station to remote radar heads at Saxa Vord and Benbecula.

RRH Buchan 
In May 2000 the Ministry of Defence announced the downgrading of RAF Buchan from a manned station to a remote radar head. The measure resulted in the loss of 55 civilian jobs and the transfer of over 200 RAF personnel. Around 92 military and civilian personnel were expected to remain to operate the remote radar head. The radar unit ceased to be a RAF station on 1 September 2004 and the operational part of the station became Remote Radar Head Buchan. The separate domestic accommodation site located in Boddam was sold by the Ministry of Defence to a private developer.

Buchan's Type T92(B3) radar (more widely known out-with RAF service as the Lockheed Martin AN/FPS-117 ) was replaced in 2015 with a new Lockheed Martin AN/TPS-77 system. The new radar was funded by wind farm developers and was installed in order to help reduce the impact of interference from wind turbines.

In 2017 the unit's radome was replaced over a six-week period, the existing enclosure having been installed in 1984.

As part of a major upgrade of Remote Radar Head sites around the United Kingdom, the Ministry of Defence began a programme entitled HYDRA in 2020 to install new state of the art communications buildings, radar towers and bespoke perimeter security.

Operations

RRH Buchan operates a Lockheed Martin AN/TPS-77 long-range surveillance radar. It collects data as part of the UK Air Surveillance And Control System (ASACS) based at RAF Boulmer and supports the creation of the recognised air picture for the United Kingdom.

Radar Flight (North) of the ASACS Engineering & Logistics Squadron based at RAF Boulmer has command and control of RRH Buchan and ensures its operational availability.

See also
 Improved United Kingdom Air Defence Ground Environment – UK air defence radar system in the UK between the 1990s and 2000s
Linesman/Mediator – UK air defence radar system in the UK between the 1960s and 1984
List of Royal Air Force stations
NATO Integrated Air Defense System

References

Buildings and structures in Peterhead
History of Aberdeenshire
Radar stations
Buchan